Solange Térac (13 February 1907 – 14 September 1993) was a French screenwriter and film director. Primarily a writer, she directed three films including Koenigsmark (1953).

Selected filmography

Director
 La vagabonde (1932)
 Mon amant l'assasin (1932)
 Koenigsmark (1953)

Screenwriter
 The Pavilion Burns (1941)
 As Long as I Live (1946)
 Once is Enough (1946)
 The Mysterious Monsieur Sylvain (1947)
 Fantomas Against Fantomas (1949)
 Eve and the Serpent (1949)
 Face to the Wind (1950)
 Shadow and Light (1951)
 Leguignon the Healer (1954)
 Let's Be Daring, Madame (1957)
 The River of Three Junks (1957)
 Passeport diplomatique agent K 8 (1965)

References

Bibliography
 H R. Kedward & Nancy Wood. The Liberation of France: Image and Event''. Bloomsbury Academic, 1995.

External links

1907 births
1993 deaths
French women film directors
20th-century French screenwriters
French women screenwriters
Film directors from Paris
20th-century French women writers
Writers from Paris